List of streams of Zagreb contains streams which flow in or near Zagreb.

Krapina
Gradna
Rakovica
Konščica
Lomnica
Kukeljnjak
Lipnica
Peščenjak
Šiljak
Bunica
Rečica
Curek
Kosnica
Koravec
Buna
Lonja
Črnec
Zelina
Čučerska Reka
Kašina
Glavničica
Nespeš
Starča
Kutnici
Bidrovec
Blicanec
Medveščak
Kustošak
Vuger
Bliznec
Črnomerec
Dolje
Dubravica
Gračec
Kraljevec
Kuniščak
Trnava
Vrapčak

External links
 Poznajete li zagrebačke potoke?, Soundset.hr 

Zagreb
Streams